The Occident is usually a historic term for the Western world (as contrasted with the Orient).

Occident or The Occident may also refer to:

 Occident (film), a 2002 Romanian film
 Occident (movement), a former French far-right political group
 The Occident and American Jewish Advocate, a 19th-century Jewish-American periodical
 Occident, California, former name of the community Maxwell, California, US
 Occident, Indiana, an unincorporated community in Rush County
 "Occident", a song from the album Have One on Me by Joanna Newsom

See also
 Occidental (disambiguation)